This is Music: The Singles 92–98 is a singles compilation album by the English alternative rock band the Verve. The compilation was released in November 2004 and included two previously unreleased tracks: "This Could Be My Moment" and "Monte Carlo". Nick McCabe did not participate in the songs, Simon Tong being the one that took the control of the lead guitar. The album was named after a track by the same name off their 1995 album A Northern Soul. The album cover is based on the cover of their 1992 single "She's a Superstar".

Track listing
All tracks written by Richard Ashcroft, Simon Jones, Peter Salisbury, and Nick McCabe, except where noted.

Charts

Weekly charts

Year-end charts

Certifications

Release history

References

External links

This Is Music: The Singles 92–98 at YouTube (streamed copy where licensed)
Official site
Feature: "A Bittersweet Tale", The Times.

The Verve albums
2004 greatest hits albums
Albums produced by John Leckie
Virgin Records compilation albums